The men's field hockey tournament at the 2012 Summer Olympics was the 22nd edition of the field hockey event for men at the Summer Olympic Games. It was held over a thirteen-day period beginning on 30 July, and culminating with the medal finals on 11 August. All games were played at the Riverbank Arena within the Olympic Park in London, United Kingdom.

Defending champions Germany won the gold medal for the fourth time after defeating the Netherlands 2–1 in the final. Australia won the bronze medal by defeating Great Britain 3–1.

Competition format
The twelve teams in the tournament were divided into two pools of six, with each team initially playing round-robin games within their pool. Following the completion of the round-robin, the top two teams from each pool advance to the semi-finals. All other teams play classification matches to determine the final tournament rankings. The two semi-final winners meet for the gold medal match, while the semi-final losers play in the bronze medal match.

Qualification
Each of the continental champions from five federations and host received an automatic berth. The European and Oceanian federations received two and one extra quotas respectively based upon the FIH World Rankings at the completion of the 2010 World Cup. In addition to the three teams qualifying through the Olympic Qualifying Tournaments, the following twelve teams, shown with final pre-tournament rankings, competed in this tournament.

Umpires
The FIH announced the list of umpires on 3 January 2012:

Squads

Preliminary round
All times are British Summer Time (UTC+01:00)'

Pool A

Pool B

Classification round

Fifth to twelfth place classification

Eleventh and twelfth place

Ninth and tenth place

Seventh and eighth place

Fifth and sixth place

Medal round

Semi-finals

Bronze medal match

Gold medal match

Final ranking

Goalscorers

References

External links
Official FIH website
Schedule 

 
Men's tournament